Charles Bonnet (Satigny 15 March 1933) is a Swiss archeologist, specialist of Ancient Nubia.

Biography 
Bonnet was born to a family of wine producers in 1933. After graduating with a diploma in Agriculture, he took over the family business in 1954. From 1961 to 1965, he studied Egyptology at the Oriental Studies centre of the University of Geneva.

He became an invited professor at Collège de France in 1985.

Bibliography 
 
Les premiers édifices chrétiens de la Madeleine à Genève, Société d'Histoire et d'Archéologie, Genève, 1977
 Kerma, Territoire et métropole, Le Caire, Institut français d'archéologie orientale, coll. « BiGen », 1986
 Kerma, royaume de Nubie (dir.), Genève, 1990
 Études nubiennes I-II (Actes du VIIe congrès des études nubiennes 3-8 septembre 1990), Genève, 1992
 avec Dominique Valbelle, Le sanctuaire d'Hathor, maîtresse de la turquoise, Sérabit el-Khadim au Moyen Empire, Paris, Picard, 1996 
 avec Dominique Valbelle (éd.), Le Sinaï durant l'antiquité et le Moyen Âge, 4000 ans d'histoire pour un désert (Actes du colloque tenu à l'Unesco en septembre 1997), Paris, Errance, 1998
 Édifices et rites funéraires à Kerma, Errance, Paris, 2000
 Le temple principal de la ville de Kerma et son quartier religieux, Paris Errance, 2004
 avec Dominique Valbelle, Des pharaons venus d’Afrique, Citadelles et Mazenod, Paris, 2005 ; The Nubian Pharaohs, The American University in Cairo Press, 2005 ; Pharaonen aus dem schwarzen Afrika, Verlag Philipp von Zabern, 2006
 avec Alain Peillex, Les fouilles de la cathédrale Saint Pierre de Genève I, Le centre urbain de la protohistoire jusqu'au début de la christianisation ; II, Les édifices chrétiens et le groupe épiscopal, Société d'Histoire et d'Archéologie, Genève, 2009-2012
 La ville nubienne de Kerma, Lausanne, Éditions Favre, 2014

Notes, citations and references
Notes

Citations

References

 Site de l'UMR 8167 Orient et Méditerranée, composante Mondes pharaoniques

Members of the Académie des Inscriptions et Belles-Lettres
Members of the Institut Français d'Archéologie Orientale
Academic staff of the University of Geneva
University of Geneva alumni
Swiss Egyptologists